Meidingu Ura Konthouba or Wura Konthouba was a Meetei ruler of Ningthouja dynasty of Ancient Manipur (Antique Kangleipak). He is the successor of Sameirang and the predecessor of Naothingkhong. In 568 AD, he issued coins for the first time in the kingdom. During his reign, the Selloi Langmai tribes attacked the Haokap hills by trespassing the Meitei territory. The Naothingkhong Phambal Kaba describes that he uprooted the Selloi-Langmai people. His daughter was married to the King of Moirang whose descendants took the surname "Ura".

Other Books

References 

Pages with unreviewed translations
Kings of Ancient Manipur